Spijkers is a Dutch surname. Notable people with the surname include:

Ben Spijkers (born 1961), Dutch judoka
Cas Spijkers (1946–2011), Dutch chef and writer

See also
Spijkers v Gebroeders Benedik Abattoir CV, United Kingdom labour law case

Dutch-language surnames